Castelletto d'Erro is a comune (municipality) in the Province of Alessandria in the Italian region Piedmont, located about  southeast of Turin and about  southwest of Alessandria.

Castelletto d'Erro borders the following municipalities: Bistagno, Cartosio, Melazzo, Montechiaro d'Acqui, and Ponti.

References

Cities and towns in Piedmont